Eronia, commonly called vagrants, is a genus of butterflies of the subfamily Pierinae found mainly in Africa. For other butterflies called "vagrants" see genus Nepheronia.

Species
Eronia cleodora Hübner, 1823 – vine-leaf vagrant
Eronia leda (Boisduval, 1847) – autumn leaf vagrant or orange-and-lemon (butterfly)

References

 
Seitz, A. Die Gross-Schmetterlinge der Erde 13: Die Afrikanischen Tagfalter. Plate XIII 21

Butterflies of Africa
Teracolini
Pieridae genera
Taxa named by Jacob Hübner